Weipa Airport  is an airport in Weipa, Queensland, Australia.

Airlines and destinations

Statistics
Weipa Airport was ranked 55th in Australia for the number of revenue passengers served in financial year 2010–2011.

See also
 List of airports in Queensland

References

External links
Airport Guide

Airports in Queensland
Weipa Town